MCOT Public Company Limited (MCOT), formerly known as the Mass Communication Organization of Thailand, is a Thai state-owned public broadcaster. It owns and operates a number of radio and television stations in Thailand. It is based in Bangkok. At present, MCOT runs seven national, one international, 52 provincial, one district radio station, two television channels (terrestrial free-to-air; until 2020), and 2 satellite television channels. (until 2017) Their motto is "Always Serving the Public". On their website MCOT uses the slogan "Digitally beyond" (Nov 2014).

History

1952–2000
On 10 November 1952, MCOT was established as Thai Television Company Limited. "Thorathat" is the Thai word for television, despite Thailand having no television services at the time. Television services under the name Thai Thorathat (Channel 4) started on 24 June 1955 in time for national day celebrations.

In 1977 TTV Radio and Thailand Color Television Channel 9 moved to the present Huai Khwang headquarters in Bangkok and merged to form the Mass Communication Organization of Thailand (MCOT). In 1970, with the launch of Chong Sam (Channel 3;Defunct in 2020), its newest station, while the original Thai Thorathat (Channel Four) network was renamed Chong Kao (Channel 9).

Witthayu Tor Tor Tor ("TTV Radio") later became Radio MCOT on 25 March 1977 and became the nation's first 24-hour radio station.

Color television began in 1970 on TV3 and 1974 on TV9. Chong Kao (Channel 9) was renamed Modernine TV in 2002.

2001–present
In 2005, the Ministry of Finance announced their plan to digitize free-to-air television broadcasts nationwide. Trial broadcasts were undertaken, involving 1,000 households in the Bangkok Metropolitan Area.

MCOT has prepared at least three new channels exclusively for digital television, besides the two initial channels, Modernine TV and Channel 3. Though the trials had been long over, the digital channels are (said to be) still active in test form.

In addition, MCOT would introduce regional television channels for each province in Thailand. Each of these regions will have its own dedicated television channel with localised content compared to national television making it about 80 television channels for a digitised MCOT as part of the state broadcaster's three-year restructuring plan. MCOT was expected to launch its digital terrestrial television services nationally in 2012. MCOT launched digital terrestrial television in 2013, with full service in 2014.

In March 2011, MCOT announced that it is also possible that MCOT may be planning to switch to DVB-T2 in some occasion.

List of radio stations
AM
MCOT Radio (Thai) – 1143 kHz (defunct as of 1 March 2021 )
LikeStation (Thai) – 1494 kHz (previously Labourers' Radio Station, defunct as of 1 January 2021 )
FM
Lukthung Mahanakhon (Thai; first FM radio station in Thailand) – 95.00 MHz
Khluen Khwam Khit (Thai) – 96.50 MHz
Mellow Pop (Thai) – 97.50 MHz (replaced Seed 97.5 FM, Off-Air since April 4th, 2022 at 7:50AM. Continuing as online radio station.)
Active Radio (Thai) – 99.00 MHz
100.5 News Network (Thai) – 100.50 MHz
Eazy FM (Thai and English) – 105.50 MHz (Operated by TERO Radio)
Met 107 (English) – 107.00 MHz
Provincial and regional
41 stations

List of television channels

Terrestrial television current channels

Analogue
All Analogue television Stations was switched off in 2020
 MCOT HD – replaced (TTV) Channel 4, (M.C.O.T.) Channel 9 , Modernine TV and Channel 9 MCOT HD
 Channel 3 – Joint operation with Bangkok Entertainment (BEC) but Now Defunct in 2020

Digital
Broadcasting on MCOT's 3rd MUX of 5 (UHF Channel 40 for Bangkok)
 MCOT HD – formerly called MCOT HD and Channel 9 MCOT HD broadcasting on service channel 30 (Simulcast with Analogue Platform until 2018)
 MCOT Family – formerly called MCOT Kids and Family broadcasting on service channel 14 (Now Defunct in 2019)

DTT Network
 MCOT (3rd MUX of 5) – UHF Channel 40 for Bangkok, and TV Network Station for Thailand's other provinces

Brand

Logo history

 Thai Thorathat's first logo depicts images of "Witchu Prapha Dhewi" (Thai: วิชชุประภาเทวี), female angels and thunderbolts, adorned with clouds and lightning within a circle, designed by the Fine Arts Department of the Ministry of Education.
 In 1977, the same time of change to MCOT organization, the logo evolved into a circle. The center is white circle; the upper part is four sections divided by the curve of spread spectrum signals; the bottom curve is yellow, and next three sections are in primary colors of light (red, green, and blue); the lower part is yellow with the Thai letters "อ.ส.ม.ท." which is the abbreviation of the organization.
In 2003, the time of change to MCOT PLC, the logo became circular gray lines intersecting like latitude and longitude, a purple figure which hides number 9 in the right part, and a gray curve in the upper part. Under this logo are the English letters "MCOT" in orange with gray border (convergence with Modernine TV, MCOT Modern Radio, and Thai News Agency)

Commercial breaks
The logo is shown on commercial breaks and test transmissions.

Clocks
The clock in Thailand was not in colour until 1974. Originally the clock was based on the clock tower in Bangkok in black and white. In 1974 the clock was yellow on blue.

Test card
Until the introduction of 24-hour broadcasting in 2002, MCOT used the PM5544 test pattern during the off-air hours of TV9 and EBU Colorbars on Channel 3. Until 2002, MCOT used the Philips PM5534 (PM5544 with clock) during off-air hours.

On-air and off-air
Currently both stations broadcast 24 hours a day.

Channel 9 MCOT HD
 1955–1960
 Channel 4 broadcast from 19:00–23:00 Bangkok Time.
 1961–1967
 Channel 4 broadcast from 18:00–23:30.
 1968–1976
 Channel 4 (and from 1974, Channel 9) broadcast from 15:00–24:00.
 1977–1984
 Channel 9 broadcast from 13:00–24:00.
 1985–1990
 Channel 9 broadcast from 10:00–24:00.
 1990–1993
 Channel 9 broadcasts for 12 hours daily, 12:00–24:00.
 1994–2002
 Channel 9 broadcasts for 20 half hours daily, 05:30–02:00.
 1 February – 30 June 2017
 Channel 9 broadcasts for 21 hours on weekday, 04:00–01:00. (for 20 half hours on Saturday and Sunday, 05:30–02:00) 
 2002–31 January 2017,1 July 2017–Present
 Channel 9 broadcasts 24/7.

ThaiTV3
 1970–1987
 Channel 3 broadcasts for six hours daily, 18:00–24:00.
 1987–1990
 Channel 3 broadcasts for eight hours daily, 16:00–24:00.
 1990–1993
 Channel 3 broadcasts for 12 hours daily, 12:00–24:00.
 1994–2004
 Channel 3 broadcasts for 18 hours daily, 06:00–24:00.
 2005–Present
 Channel 3 broadcasts 24/7.

MCOT Family
 1 April 2014 – 24 May 2014: MCOT Family was broadcast 12 hours daily, 12:00–24:00 (test of transmission).
 25 May 2014 – Don't Know & Don't Know – Present: MCOT Family broadcasts 24/7.
 Don't Know – Don't Know : MCOT Family broadcasts 16 hours daily, 06:00–22:00

See also
 List of television stations in Thailand

References

External links
 

Publicly funded broadcasters
Television in Thailand
Mass media companies of Thailand
1952 establishments in Thailand
Organizations established in 1952
Mass media in Bangkok
Television channels and stations established in 1977
State media
Government-owned companies of Thailand